John Walter Scott Biggar (March 21, 1843 – July 3, 1897) was an Ontario, Canada farmer and political figure. He represented Bruce North in the Legislative Assembly of Ontario as a Conservative member from 1886 to 1890.

He was born in Woolwich, England, in 1843; his father and mother were born in Scotland. He was educated in the Netherlands and London and later came to Saugeen Township, Canada West with his family in 1859. In 1873, he married Margaret Geddes. He served in the militia, travelling with Colonel Wolsely's Red River expedition in 1870, and later became lieutenant-colonel in the local militia. He died in 1897.

References

External links
The Canadian parliamentary companion, 1889 JA Gemmill

1843 births
1897 deaths
Canadian people of Scottish descent
English emigrants to pre-Confederation Ontario
Immigrants to the Province of Canada
Progressive Conservative Party of Ontario MPPs